Cladosporium fusiforme is a fungus found in hypersaline environments. It has ovoid to ellipsoid conidia. It has also been found in animal feed.

References

Cladosporium
Fungi described in 2007